Asterope batesii, the Bates' asterope, is a species of butterfly of the family Nymphalidae. It is found in inland Brazil, including Ayeyros, along the Tapajós and in Tefé on the Upper Amazon.

The larvae feed on Paullinia species.

External links
Images
Linnean 18-1 – January 2002

Biblidinae
Fauna of Brazil
Nymphalidae of South America
Butterflies described in 1850
Taxa named by William Chapman Hewitson